Marie-Pier Lafontaine is a Canadian writer. She is most noted for her 2019 novel Chienne, which was a shortlisted finalist for the Governor General's Award for French-language fiction at the 2020 Governor General's Awards. 

The novel also won the French Prix Sade in 2020.

References

21st-century Canadian novelists
21st-century Canadian women writers
Canadian women novelists
Canadian novelists in French
French Quebecers
Living people
Year of birth missing (living people)